Seven ships of the British Royal Navy have been named HMS Myrmidon after the Myrmidons of Greek mythology.

 The first  was a 22-gun sixth rate in use from 1781 to 1811.
 The second  was a 20-gun sixth rate launched 1813 and broken up 1823.
 The third  was an iron-hulled paddle gun vessel in service from 1845 to 1858.
 The fourth  was a wooden-hulled screw gun vessel,  launched in June 1867 but completed in October as a survey vessel, and sold in 1889.
 The fifth  was a destroyer launched in 1900 and lost in a collision with a passenger ship in 1917.
 The seventh  was a minesweeper launched in 1944 and broken up 1958.

Royal Navy ship names